Ndaitwah is a surname. Notable people with the surname include:

 Epaphras Denga Ndaitwah (born 1952), Namibian diplomat and military commander
 Netumbo Nandi-Ndaitwah (born 1952), Namibian politician and government minister, wife of Epaphras Denga Ndaitwah

Surnames of African origin